Edwin S. Lyman is a physicist and the Director of Nuclear Power Safety  with the Union of Concerned Scientists (UCS). He specializes in nuclear proliferation, nuclear terrorism, and nuclear power safety.

Lyman has published extensively in journals and magazines, testified before Congress and advised other government groups, and been cited in many news stories.  He acted as an expert analyst for damage to the Fukushima Daiichi nuclear power plant after the  2011 Tōhoku earthquake and tsunami  and co-authored Fukushima: The Story of a Nuclear Disaster (New Press, 2014).

Education
Lyman earned his A.B. in physics at New York University in 1986.  At Cornell University he received his M.Sc. in  1990 and his  Ph.D. in physics in 1992.  He focused on string theory and high energy physics, preferring research with few military applications.

Career
From 1992 to 1995, Lyman did postdoctoral research on science and security policy at Princeton University in the  Center for Energy and Environmental Studies (later the Science and Global Security Program). One of the questions he considered was how to deal with post-Cold War plutonium. He and  his colleagues sought ways to turn it into a stable waste form for disposal. 

From 1995 to 2003, Lyman worked for the Nuclear Control Institute, where he promoted conversion of reactors from highly enriched to low-enriched uranium, which is not directly weapon-usable. He also advised on the protection of nuclear sites from terrorist attacks.
He became president of the Institute in 2001. 

In 2003, Lyman joined the Union of Concerned Scientists (UCS) as a senior scientist later becoming the Director of Nuclear Power Safety.

Lyman publishes extensively in journals and magazines, and has advised Congress and other government groups on a variety of topics relating to nuclear power, nuclear weapons and safety.
He has recommended that the U.S. Nuclear Regulatory Commission (NRC) implement safety and security upgrades to prevent the possibility of terrorist attacks.  Given the events of September 11 he describes NRC delays in doing so an "ominous trend".

Following the 2011 Tōhoku earthquake and tsunami Lyman served as an expert analyst on damage to the Fukushima Daiichi nuclear power plant.  He is a co-author  with David Lochbaum and Susan Q. Stranahan of Fukushima: The Story of a Nuclear Disaster (New Press, 2014).

Lyman is a member of the Institute of Nuclear Materials Management and the American Nuclear Society.

Awards
In 2018, Lyman was awarded the 2018 Leo Szilard Lectureship Award from the American Physical Society "for using his technical expertise and tireless advocacy to maintain and strengthen U.S. policy on nuclear nonproliferation and reactor safety and security."

See also
Nuclear accidents in the United States
Nuclear safety in the United States
David Lochbaum
Frank N. von Hippel
M.V. Ramana
Mark Cooper

References

21st-century American physicists
People associated with nuclear power
Living people
Cornell University alumni
Year of birth missing (living people)